Bernard (George) Stevens (2 March 1916 – 6 January 1983) was a British composer who first became known to a wider public when he won a newspaper composition prize for a 'Victory Symphony' in post-war 1946. The broader success was not sustained, but Stevens went on to become a respected composer and teacher at the Royal College of Music, using traditional forms for his compositions while extending his essentially tonal harmonic language towards serialism.

Life
Born in Stamford Hill London, Stevens grew up in Essex, and received his first musical education at Southend High School, where his teacher was Arthur Hutchings. He began piano lessons at the age of eight. The pianist and Bach specialist Harold Samuel heard him play and offered encouragement. He went on to study English and Music at St John's College, Cambridge, with E. J. Dent and Cyril Rootham, then at the Royal College of Music with R. O. Morris (composition) and Gordon Jacob (orchestration) from 1937 to 1940. At the college Arthur Benjamin taught him piano and Constant Lambert conducting.  

Called up for war service in 1940 he was rejected for a combat role due to his poor eyesight, so served in the Royal Army Pay Corps. While there he composed his Piano Trio and his Violin Sonata, Op. 1, written for his wife Bertha, a violin teacher who he married in 1941. The sonata attracted the attention of Max Rostal, who commissioned a Violin Concerto, which Stevens also wrote during his army service. In 1946 his First Symphony, entitled Symphony of Liberation, won first prize in a competition sponsored by the Daily Express newspaper for a 'Victory Symphony' to celebrate the end of the war with a high profile premiere at the Royal Albert Hall. The competition judges were Arthur Bliss, Constant Lambert and Malcolm Sargent. The symphony was dedicated to the memory of his friend, the artist and poet Clive Branson, who was killed in action in 1944.

The success of the symphony led to some lucrative work scoring films in the late 1940s, but after completing three scores Stevens decided not to continue writing film music. In 1948 he was appointed Professor of Composition at the Royal College of Music, a post he combined from 1967 with a professorship at the University of London. As an examiner he travelled widely, especially in Eastern Europe. His students included Keith Burstein, Stephen Dodgson, Michael Finnissy, Erika Fox, Malcolm Lipkin, Carlo Martelli and John White.

Stevens was intellectually and emotionally committed to the left and associated with other socialist artists and writers, such as his friends Alan Bush, Mary and Geraldine Peppin, Randall Swingler and Montagu Slater, and was active in the Workers' Music Association. In 1955 a contentious slander case served by Edward Clark on Benjamin Frankel (involving an accusation that Frankel had embezzled ISCM funds) involved Bernard Stevens and Christian Darnton as witnesses. They were accused by Frankel of lying at the behest of the Communist Party. This had a devastating effect on Stevens. He resigned his Party membership a year later, also as a  protest against the Soviet suppression of the 1956 Hungarian uprising. He nevertheless remained committed to Marxist principles. 

Stevens lived at 71 Parkhill Road, Belsize Park after the war, a house he bought from Max Rostal. Seeking a more peaceful environment where he could compose, he moved in 1951 to a village in Essex, where his address was The Forge, Great Maplestead. His music room was in a converted blacksmith's forge next to the house. In the late 1960s he and Bertha acquired a small plot of land near Mahón on the island of Menorca and built a holiday villa there, where they spent many summers over the following decade. His final work, the Concertante for Two Pianos (written for Isobel Beyer and Harvey Dagul), was composed at the villa. Stevens died in January 1983 after being diagnosed with cancer six years earlier. He was survived by his wife Bertha and daughter Catherine Stevens (born 1952), a viola player.

Music
Influenced by composers such as Ernest Bloch, Ferruccio Busoni, Shostakovich, Alan Bush and Edmund Rubbra, Stevens also used fantasia-like elements of form which he took from the Elizabethans Dowland and Farnaby. He frequently composed tightly compressed works - such as the Opus 1 Violin Sonata and the later Piano Sonata - incorporating three individual movements within a single, uninterrupted span. The Symphony No.1 (1945), a cry of "Liberation" after Nazism, could seem gestural with its looser structure and programmatic elements, and is not typical. Even so, it "completely avoids the rhetoric and pomp of many other 'Victory' pieces". His Fugal Overture received its premiere at the BBC Proms in 1948, conducted by Malcolm Sargent.

The more inward looking pieces that followed use an essentially diatonic but increasingly individual harmonic language. An example is the 1952 Cello Concerto written for William Pleeth, with its dark and expressive central Chaconne. The later works attracted less public attention, but were highly regarded by musicians. Stevens began to explore a very personal application of 12-note serialism. This is best illustrated in three key works: the String Quartet No 2 (1962), the Symphony No 2 (1964) and the Variations for Orchestra (1964). In these works everything that follows is derived from the opening materials, and (as Malcolm MacDonald has pointed out) the 12 note series employed are used in the context of tonalism "to supply triads, scalic segments, leading notes and other elements of tonal vocabulary". Of the String Quartet No 2, Macdonald says: 

Towards the end of his life Stevens explored new methods of tonal organization involving correspondence with the I Ching - evident in his final piece of chamber music, Autumn Sequence (1980) for guitar and harpsichord. In recent years most of his major orchestral, chamber and piano works have been recorded.

List of works

Orchestral 
 Violin Concerto, Op. 4 (1943)
 Ricercar, Op. 6, for string orchestra (1944)
 A Symphony of Liberation, Op. 7 (1945)
 Eclogue, Op. 8, for small orchestra (1946) 
 Fugal Overture, Op. 9, for orchestra (1947)
 Sinfonietta, Op. 10, for string orchestra (1948) (dedicated to Norman Fulton)
 Overture East and West, Op. 16, for wind orchestra (1950)
 Cello Concerto, Op. 18 (1952) 
 Piano Concerto, Op. 26 (1955, rev. 1981)
 Dance Suite, Op. 28, for orchestra (1957) 
 Adagio and Fugue, Op. 31a, for wind orchestra (1959)
 Prelude and Fugue, Op. 31b, for orchestra (1960)
 Symphony No. 2, Op. 35 (1964)
 Variations, Op. 36, for orchestra (1964)
 Choriamb, Op. 41 (1968)
 Introduction, Variations and Fugue on a theme of Giles Farnaby, Op. 47, for orchestra (1972)

Opera 
 Mimosa, Op. 15, unfinished opera in 3 acts to libretto by Montagu Slater (1950)
 The Shadow of the Glen, Op. 50, opera in 1 act to libretto by J. M. Synge (1978–79)

Choral and vocal 
 Mass, for unaccompanied double choir (1938–39) 
 The Harvest of Peace, Op. 19, cantata for speaker, soprano, baritone, mixed choir and string orchestra to text by Randall Swingler (1952)
 The Palatine Coast: Three Folkish Songs, Op. 21, for high voice and piano (1952)
 The Pilgrims of Hope, Op. 27, cantata for soprano, baritone, mixed choir and orchestra to text by William Morris (1956, rev. 1968)
 Two Poetical Sketches, Op. 32, for female voices and strings to text by William Blake (1961)
 Thanksgiving, Op. 37, motet for mixed choir and string orchestra (or organ) to text by Rabindranath Tagore (1965)
 Et Resurrexit, Op. 43, cantata for alto, tenor, mixed choir and orchestra to texts from Ecclesiastes and Randall Swingler (1969)
 Hymn to Light, Op. 44, anthem for mixed choir, organ, brass and percussion to text by Rabindranath Tagore (1970)
 The Turning World, Op. 46, motet for baritone, mixed choir, orchestra and piano to text by Randall Swingler (1971)
 The True Dark, Op. 49, song cycle for baritione and piano to text by Randall Swingler (1974)

Chamber and instrumental 
 Violin Sonata, Op. 1 (1940)
 Theme and variations for piano, Op. 2 (1941)
 Piano Trio, Op. 3 (1942)
 Theme and Variations, Op. 11, for string quartet (1949) (implicitly String Quartet No. 1)
 Two Fanfares, Op. 12, for four natural trumpets (1949)
 Fantasia on The Irish Ho-Hoane, Op. 13, for piano duet (1949)
 Ballad No 1, Op. 17 for solo piano
 Fantasia on a Theme of Dowland, Op. 23, for violin and piano (1953)
 Two Improvisations on Folk Songs, Op. 24, for brass quintet (1954)
 Piano Sonata in One Movement, Op. 25 (1954)
 Introduction and Allegro, Op. 29, for piano duet (1957)
 Lyric Suite, Op. 30, for string trio (1958)
 Two Dances, Op. 33, for piano duet (1962)
 String Quartet No. 2, Op. 34 (1962)
 Horn Trio, Op. 38 (1966)
 Fantasia for organ, Op. 39 (1966)
 Suite, Op. 40, for flute, oboe, violin, viola da gamba or viola, cello and harpsichord or piano (1967)
 Ballad No 2, Op. 42 for solo piano (1969, premiere Ronald Stevenson)
 Fughetta for organ (1974)
 Autumn Sequence, Op. 52 for guitar and harpsichord (1980)
 Elegiac Fugue on the name Geraldine (1981) (in memory Geraldine Peppin)
 Concertante for two pianos, Op.55 (1982)

Film 
 The Upturned Glass (1947) (concert orchestral sequence arranged by Adrian Williams)
 The Mark of Cain (1947) (concert orchestral sequence arranged by Adrian Williams)
 Once a Jolly Swagman (1948)

References

External links

 Catalogue of Works, Impulse Music
Beginning 4 July 2016, Bernard Stevens was featured as BBC Radio 3's Composer of the week
 Russell, Ken. Classic Widows, television documentary, 1995

1916 births
1983 deaths
20th-century classical composers
English classical composers
British music educators
Alumni of St John's College, Cambridge
Alumni of the Royal College of Music
Academics of the University of London
Musicians from London
20th-century English composers
English male classical composers
20th-century British male musicians
British Army personnel of World War I
British Army soldiers
Military personnel from London